The United States Air Force Expeditionary Center is the Air Force's Center of Excellence for advanced expeditionary combat support training and education. It consists of nine units with approximately 14,000 Airmen in 28 countries.

History
The U.S. Air Force Expeditionary Center is the Air Force's Center of Excellence for advanced mobility and combat support training and education. Located on the Fort Dix entity of Joint Base McGuire–Dix–Lakehurst, N.J., the center has direct oversight for end route and installation support, contingency response and partner capacity-building mission sets within the global mobility enterprise. The center provides administrative control for six wings and two groups within Air Mobility Command, including the 87th Air Base Wing and the 621st Contingency Response Wing on the McGuire AFB entity of Joint Base McGuire-Dix-Lakehurst, the 319th Air Base Wing at Grand Forks AFB, N.D.; the 515th Air Mobility Operations Wing at Joint Base Pearl Harbor-Hickam, Hawaii; the 521st Air Mobility Operations Wing at Ramstein AFB, Germany; the 628th Air Base Wing at Joint Base Charleston, S.C.; the 43d Air Mobility Operations Group at Pope Field, N.C.; and 627th Air Base Group at Joint Base Lewis-McChord, Wash.

The Expeditionary Operations School at the Expeditionary Center offers 92 in-residence courses and 19 web-based training courses, graduating more than 40,000 students annually. Courses include the Air Force Phoenix Raven Training, Advanced Study of Air Mobility and Aerial Port Operations Course.

Both the 87th Air Base Wing and the 628th Air Base Wing are Air Force lead organizations on joint bases that host AMC flying units, along with other Department of Defense partners. The 43d Air Mobility Operations Group and 627th Air Base Group partner with the U.S. Army, while the 319th Air Base Wing supports the Department of Homeland Defense and Air Combat Command emerging missions.

The 515th and 521st AMOWs, along with the 621st CRW, are responsible for end route and combat support, contingency response and partner capacity-building mission sets around the globe.

The Expeditionary Center was first opened as the Air Mobility Warfare Center on 1 May 1994, and officially received its mission on 1 Oct. 1994. At first opening, the center operated the Phoenix Ace Combat Readiness Exercise and Evaluation Course, Mobile Air Tactics School, Force Support and Readiness Course, Maintenance Training Qualification Program Course, Air Transport Manager Course, Director of Mobility Forces Course, Environmental Control Unit Course, Intermediate Wartime Contingencies Course, Cargo Operations and Systems Course, Passenger Operations and Systems Course, Command and Control Information Processing Systems Course.

The center was officially renamed as U.S. Air Force Expeditionary Center on 4 March 2007. On 7 January 2011, the center expanded in scope, taking added responsibility for evolving AMC mission sets.

USAF Expeditionary Operations School

The USAF Expeditionary Operations School (“EOS”) of the USAF Expeditionary Center, is for mobility and expeditionary operations skills training and Air Mobility Command's provider of support to the mobility enterprise.

The EOS offers a variety of training, from combat support to logistics. The EOS is responsible for advanced leadership training, including Advanced Studies of Air Mobility Course and the Director of Mobility Forces Course. 
 
The EOS offers 74 in-resident courses and graduates approximately 8,000 students per year from the Expeditionary Center main campus at ASA Fort Dix, Joint Base McGuire-Dix-Lakehurst, N.J., from the mobile training team class and from detachments Hurlburt Air Force Base, Fla., and Scott Air Force Base, Ill.

List of commanders

References

External links

United States Air Force
United States Air Force military education and training
Military installations in New Jersey
Centers of the United States Air Force
1994 establishments in New Jersey